Nitroxyl (common name) or azanone (IUPAC name) is the chemical compound HNO. It is well known in the gas phase. Nitroxyl can be formed as a short-lived intermediate in the solution phase. The conjugate base, NO−, nitroxide anion, is the reduced form of nitric oxide (NO) and is isoelectronic with dioxygen.

Generation
Nitroxyl is produced from the reagents Angeli's salt (Na2N2O3) and Piloty's acid (PhSO2NHOH). Other notable studies on the production of HNO exploit cycloadducts of acyl nitroso species, which are known to decompose via hydrolysis to HNO and acyl acid. Upon photolysis these compounds release the acyl nitroso species which then further decompose.
HNO is generated via organic oxidation of cyclohexanone oxime with lead tetraacetate to form 1-nitrosocyclohexyl acetate:

This compound can be hydrolyzed under basic conditions in a phosphate buffer to HNO, acetic acid, and cyclohexanone.

Dichloramine reacts with the hydroxide ion, which is always present in water, to yield nitroxyl and the chloride ion.

Reactions
Nitroxyl is a weak acid, with pKa of about 11, the conjugate base being the triplet state of NO−, sometimes called nitroxide. Nitroxyl itself, however, is a singlet ground state. Thus, deprotonation of nitroxyl uniquely involves the forbidden spin crossing from the singlet state starting material to triplet state product:
1HNO + B− → 3NO− + BH
Due to the spin-forbidden nature of deprotonation, proton abstraction is many orders of magnitude slower (k =  for deprotonation by OH−) than what one would expect for a heteroatom proton-transfer process (processes that are so fast that they are sometimes diffusion-controlled).

The Ka of starting from or ending with the electronic excited states has also been determined. When process of deprotonating singlet state HNO to obtain singlet state NO− has a pKa is about 23. On the other hand, when deprotonating triplet HNO to obtain triplet NO−, the pKa is about −1.8. 

Nitroxyl rapidly decomposes by a bimolecular pathway to nitrous oxide (k at 298 K = ):
2 HNO → N2O + H2O

The reaction proceeds via dimerization to hyponitrous acid, H2N2O2, which subsequently undergoes dehydration. Therefore, HNO is generally prepared in situ as described above.

Nitroxyl is very reactive towards nucleophiles, including thiols. The initial adduct rearranges to a sulfinamide:
HNO + RSH → RS(O)NH2

Detection
In biological samples, nitroxyl can be detected using fluorescent sensors, many of which are based on the reduction of copper(II) to copper(I) with concomitant increase in fluorescence.

Medicinal chemistry
Nitroxyl donors, known as nitroso compounds, show potential in the treatment of heart failure and ongoing research is focused on finding new molecules for this task.

See also
 Nitroxyl radicals (also called aminoxyl radicals) — chemical species containing the R2N−O• functional group

References 

Hydrogen compounds
Triatomic molecules
Nitrogen oxoacids
Oxygen compounds